The Ukrainian Catholic Apostolic Exarchate of Italy is an Apostolic Exarchate (pre-diocesan jurisdiction) of the Ukrainian Greek Catholic Church covers its faithful in Italy and San Marino.

History

Early history
At the end of the 20th century, Greek Catholics had only three churches in Italy. They all were in Rome. However, with the onset of emigration from Ukraine to Italy, thousands of people arrived for which mission stations were established. On 16 October 2001, by agreement between Head of the Ukrainian Greek Catholic Church and the Episcopal Conference of Italy was appointed pastoral coordinator, Rev. Vasyl Potochnyak, with a task to coordinate these missionary stations. Also on 14 January 2003 was appointed Apostolic visitor, bishop Hlib Lonchyna, who was deputed to investigate circumstance of the Ukrainian faithful in country, and to submit a report to the Holy See and to the Synod of Bishops of the Ukrainian Greek Catholic Church. He was replaced by bishop Dionisio Lachovicz in 2009.

Establishment 
It was established on 11 July 2019 by Pope Francis for the 145 Ukrainian Greek Catholic parishes. The circumscription encompasses the entire Italian territory. The Church of Santi Sergio e Bacco, that is located on Piazza Madonna dei Monti in the rione of Monti in Rome, become as the cathedral.

As for November 2022 the Apostolic Exarchate has 170 parishes.

Hierarches

Apostolic visitors
Hlib Lonchyna, M.S.U. (14 January 2003 – 7 January 2009), Titular Bishop of Bareta
Dionisio Lachovicz, O.S.B.M. (19 January 2009 – 11 July 2019), Titular Bishop of Egnatia

Apostolic exarches
Cardinal Angelo De Donatis (11 July 2019 – 24 October 2020), Apostolic Administrator sede vacante
Dionisio Lachovicz, O.S.B.M. (5 September 2019 – 24 October 2020), Delegate with the rights of Apostolic Exarch
Dionisio Lachovicz, O.S.B.M. (since 24 October 2020)

Churches

References

External links
Profile at catholic-hierarchy.org
 Profile at GCatholic.org

Ukrainian Greek Catholic Church
Italy
2019 establishments in Italy
Christian organizations established in 2019
Catholic dioceses in Italy